Abadeh (also Romanized as Ābādeh) is a city and capital of Abadeh County, in Fars Province, Iran. At the 2006 census, its population was 52,042, in 14,184 families. As of 2009, the population was estimated to be 59,042.

It is the largest city in the Northern Fars Region (South Central-Iran), which is famed for its carved wood-work, made of the wood of pear and box trees. Sesame oil, castor oil, grain, and various fruits are also produced there. The area is famous for its Abadeh rugs.

An interesting fact is that Abadeh is closer, road-distance-wise to 4 provincial capitals of Isfahan (193 km), Yasuj (197 km), Yazd (217 km), and Shahrekord (237 km) compared to the distance to the provincial capital of its corresponding province, Shiraz (260 km).

History 
According to the texts of archaeologists, the settlement in the current area of Abadeh dates back to the first millennium BC. Nomadic Kurdish groups were the first to settle in the plain between Abadeh and Isfahan in the Achaemenid period. Remaining ancient monuments, such as the ancient castle of Izadkhas and Bahram Gur Palace in Surmaq, are proofs of the existence of culture and civilization in this geographical area. Abadeh city has a special position due to its location at the three-way communication between Isfahan, Yazd and Shiraz.

Landmarks and crafts

Abadeh historical monuments include Emirate Kolah Farangi, Tymcheh Sarafyan and Khaje tomb, located in the Khoja mountains.
Abadeh crafts can be embroidered in cotton. The town also produces Abadeh rugs.

The rugs tend to be based on a cotton warp and have a thin, tightly knotted pile. Most Abadeh rugs are closely cut making them very flat. Although some of the older Abadehs vary in style, many of the new designs are easily recognisable. These new designs, known as Heybatlu consist of a single diamond shaped medallion in the centre with smaller medallions on each corner. The pattern is typically geometrical flowers or animals and the main colours are light reds or burnt orange on top of a dark blue background with strong green details. The corners or borders are generally ivory in colour. Although some Abadeh and Shiraz rugs appear similar Abadeh can normally be differentiated by their higher knot counts as well as the fact that the warp is invariably cotton. The rugs are almost always exclusively medium in size and the KPSI of an average Abadeh is around 90. As always in the rug-world you get what you pay for however in general Abadeh are well made and fairly popular items, particularly in modern interiors or those with a Mediterranean or North African style.

Geographical location 
Abadeh city is located in the northernmost point of Fars province. Abadeh is connected to Isfahan province from the north and west, Safacity and Eqlid from the south, and Yazd province from the east.

Transportation 

Expressway 65 passes through Abadeh. This situation helps Abadeh to improve its capabilities compared to the neighboring city, Eqlid. Road 78 makes connections from Abadeh to Abarkuh, Yazd Eqlid and Yasuj. It has a junction with Abadeh Shiraz Expressway 24 km south of the city. A road starts from Abadeh Ring Road to Soqad and Semirom, Road 55.

The railroad from Isfahan to Shiraz passes Abadeh and there are train services at Abadeh Railway Station to Shiraz, Esfahan, Tehran and Mashad. Abadeh Airport (OISA) was planned to be built in the mid 1990s.

Universities 

 Islamic Azad University, Abadeh branch

Contemporary people 
 Jalal Zolfonun was an Iranian musician

  Mahmoud Zoufonoun was an Iranian-born American musician accomplished in the art of Persian traditional music.
 Hooshmand Aghili is a prominent Iranian singer
 Ruhollah Hosseinian was an Iranian principalist politician.
 Rahmatollah Khosravi is an Iranian politician who was formerly a member of the Iranian Parliament and City Council of Tehran.
 Mojtaba Heidarpanah  is an Iranian cartoonist, illustrator, painter, character designer and animator.
 Mahmoud Mohammadi (diplomat) is an Iranian diplomat and politician.

Sport
Abadeh's main sport is football, as in the rest of the country. The main stadium is Takhti Stadium located in Mo'allem Square. The main team in Abadeh is Behineh Rahbar Abadeh F.C. which is currently playing in Iran Football's 3rd Division after finishing first in Fars Provincial League (FPL) last year. It played in Hazfi Cup 2010-11 reaching the fourth round.

Air defense base
In 2012 Iran announced it had started the construction of an air defense site in the city of Abadeh. The site is planned to be the largest in the country and will house 6,000 personnel for a variety of duties, including educational ones.

Geography

Climate 
Abadeh features a continental semi-arid climate (Köppen climate classification BSk) with heat and dryness over summer, and cold (extreme at times) and wet winter, with huge variations between daytime and nighttime throughout the year. The area can experience severely cold weather due to its high elevation.

Handicrafts 
Abadeh woodwork is world famous and its examples are kept in world museums as the best works of art. The carvings of the Marble Palace were made by the artists of this city, such as Master Ahmad Emami.  In 2017, the World Council of Handicrafts (WCC) introduced Abadeh as the world city of carving. Monbat Abadeh has 150 active domestic or commercial carving workshops and 5000 carving artists.

Mines 
The mines located in this city are:

Esteghlal Abadeh large refractory soil mine is one of the largest producers of this mineral. In addition to the Esteghlal refractory mine, there is also an industrial mine around the city where the raw materials are from tile, ceramic and brick factories in the country.

References

Populated places in Abadeh County
Cities in Fars Province